Princess Consort Munhwa of the Munhwa Yu clan (Hangul: 문화부부인 문화 유씨, Hanja: 文化府夫人 文化 柳氏; 27 October 1598 – 3 August 1676) was a Korean Royal Family member though her marriage as the first wife of Grand Prince Neungwon, the second son of Wonjong of Joseon and Queen Inheon. Lady Yu was the daughter of Yu Hyo-rib (유효립). Yu Hyo-rib was the son of Yu Hui-gyeon (유희견), the older brother of Yu Hui-bun (유희분) who was the nephew of Yu Ja-sin (유자신), the father of Deposed Queen Yu and the father in-law of Gwanghaegun of Joseon.

Marriage
She married with Seonjo of Joseon's 5th son, Prince Jeongwon's 3rd son, Yi-Bo, Prince Neungwon (이보 능원군). She later bore him a daughter and several children but died too early after the birth. However, in 1628, her father was executed in Ok-sa (옥사) after conspiracy to make Prince Inseong (인성군), the first son of Seonjo of Joseon and Royal Noble Consort Jeong of the Yeoheung Min clan as the new King to succeeded Gwanghae in the throne, so King Injo demanded his little brother, Grand Prince Neungwon to divorced from her.

At first, he refused this, but later removed her from her title and demoted to just be his concubine (첩, 妾), also she couldn't bore him any child. Although that, she can still able to lived in his home. Even her husband often asked for her resignation, Injo refused to listen on him and saying that he couldn't have her as his primary wife because of her father's problems and conspirasies.

Later life
She lived more long than her husband whom died in 1565 and was allowed to remain at the her husband's sister in-law's home in Yihyeon, Hanseong-bu,  Yangju-si, Gyeonggi-do. Later, after his death, she was reinstated in 1699 (25th year reign of Sukjong of Joseon) and after her death on 3 August 1676, she was buried along with her husband in Grand Prince Neungwon Mausoleum. She died at 78 years old.

Then, both of Prince Yeongpung (영풍군) and Prince Geumcheon (금천군) complained about her resentment but later honoured her as Princess Consort Yu (군부인 유씨).

Family 
 Great-Great-Great-Great-Grandfather
 Yu Je-geun (류제근, 柳悌根)
 Great-Great-Great-Grandfather
 Yu Su-cheon (류수천, 柳壽千)
 Great-Great-Grandfather
 Yu Jam (류잠, 柳潛) (1509 - 1576)
 Great-Great-Grandmother
 Lady Jeong of the Hadong Jeong clan (하동 정씨) (1510 – 1587)
 Great-Grandfather
 Yu Ja-shin (류자신, 柳自新) (December 1541 - 7 February 1612); Queen Yu’s father 
 Great-Grandmother
 Internal Princess Consort Bongwon of the Dongrae Jeong clan (봉원부부인 동래 정씨, 蓬原府夫人 東萊 鄭氏) (1541 - 1620)
 Grandfather
 Yu Hui-geon (유희견, 柳希鏗)
 Grandmother
 Lady Yi of the Jeonju Yi clan (전주 이씨); daughter of Yi Hyeon, Prince Giseong (기성군 이현, 箕城君 李俔)
 Father
 Yu Hyo-rib (유효립, 柳孝立) (1579 - 1628)
 Husband
 Yi Bo, Grand Prince Neungwon (이보 능원대군) (15 May 1598 - 26 January 1656)
 Father-in-law - King Wonjong (조선 원종) (2 August 1580 - 2 February 1620)
 Mother-in-law - Queen Inheon of the Neungseong Gu clan (인헌왕후 구씨) (23 May 1578 - 10 February 1626)
 Issue
 Unnamed daughter

References

1598 births
1676 deaths
15th-century Korean women
16th-century Korean people